Rhododendron × duclouxii is a hybrid rhododendron species native to Yunnan, China. Its parents are R. spiciferum and R. spinuliferum.

 References 

 Bull. Soc. Agric. Sarthe'' 39: 46 46 1903.
 Hirsutum.com

duclouxii